Rag gourd may refer to:
 The plant genus Luffa
 Luffa aegyptiaca, a particular species of Luffa